The Corps of Forty, also known as Dal Chalisa or  Turkan-e-Chahalgani was a council of 40 mostly Turkic slave emirs who administered the Delhi Sultanate as per the wishes of the sultan. However, their number was not always 40, Barani clearly mentions that Turkan-e-Chahalgani numbered 25 as well. It was a regular ministerial body in the Muslim history of the Indian subcontinent. Although all power was vested in the sultan, as the head of state, head of government, commander of the sultanate's armies and the final decision-maker in the judicial system, he needed help ruling his kingdom effectively.

It was initially formed by Shamsuddin Iltutmish, the third ruler of the Mamluk dynasty. After Iltutmish's death, the balance of power shifted and the sultan became a puppet of these emirs. They would enthrone and depose Iltutmish's children and grandchildren, often murdering them when they proved troublesome. It would take a brutal man like Sultan Balban, one of Iltutmish's slaves and former member of the Corps, to break the power of the emirs and restore the power & stature of the sultan. This destruction of the Corps would prove to be a double-edged sword. Without the Chahalgani around to maintain a Turkic monopoly on power, the Afghans started climbing the ladders of power and ultimately overthrew the Turks in the Khilji Revolution.

References 

Delhi Sultanate
Historical legislatures in India